Triangle is a BBC Television soap opera broadcast in the early 1980s, set aboard a North Sea ferry that sailed from Felixstowe to Gothenburg and Gothenburg to Amsterdam. A third imaginary leg existed between Amsterdam and Felixstowe to justify the programme's title, but this was not operated by the ferry company. The show ran for three series before being cancelled, but is still generally remembered as "some of the most mockable British television ever produced". The scripts involved clichéd relationships and stilted dialogue, making the show the butt of several jokes—particularly on Terry Wogan's morning Radio 2 programme—which caused some embarrassment to the BBC. (BBC Classic sitcom "Are You Being Served?" in Season 8, Episode 1 "Is It Catching?" hinted at the show being nausea-inducing for more reasons than just its setting. Even the anarchic BBC sitcom The Young Ones poked fun at the series, when one character says, "Even Triangle has better furniture than this!")

In 1992, the BBC screened TV Hell, an evening of programming devoted to the worst television had to offer, and the first episode of Triangle was broadcast as part of the line-up.

The ferry used in the first series was the Tor Line's . This was replaced in the second and third series by the DFDS vessel Dana Anglia (DFDS having acquired Tor Line by this time), probably because she had a less intensive schedule, and the longer time she spent in port made on-board filming easier.

Production limitations
Interviewed for a TV Hell segment in 1992, the show's producer, Bill Sellars, and the leading actor, Larry Lamb, spoke of several problems with the show's production.

Using a ferry as the setting for a television series had originally looked like a promising idea. The regular cast, playing the crew, could be joined by a constantly changing guest cast playing the passengers as the ship sailed to interesting European locations (a format used in the American series The Love Boat). Advances in portable video cameras and recording equipment meant that the show could be videotaped on board a real ferry with more realism than using studio sets and more cheaply than using the 16mm film that was normal for location television drama at the time.

Unfortunately, the plan was revealed to be flawed almost as soon as location shooting—largely conducted in the North Sea—began. The inclement weather made the exterior scenes appear gloomy and dull, and far from glamorous. In making the first episode, Kate O'Mara had to endure a scene in which she sunbathes topless on a clearly freezing deck.

Another problem involved lighting. The cameras were perfectly comfortable with either natural or artificial lighting conditions, but a mixture of the two always produced unnatural-looking colour. The video cameras of the day did not cope well with contrasting light levels between inside and outside, so interior scenes often had to be shot with the windows or portholes curtained—so that as far as the audience was concerned they might as well have been shot in a studio anyway.

The relatively new "electronic field production" portable video technology (used for location footage in place of the traditional 16mm film) also exhibited serious problems—owing to, amongst other things, the movement of the ship which disrupted the stability of the video recorders. Rough seas also induced seasickness in many of the production crew, making shooting an uncomfortable experience.

Broadcasts
The programme was broadcast every Monday and Wednesday.

 Series 1: 5 January – 1 April 1981: 26 episodes.
 Series 2: 26 April – 20 July 1982: 26 episodes.
 Series 3: 5 April – 6 July 1983: 26 episodes

Cast
Michael Craig and Larry Lamb were the only cast members to appear in all 78 episodes of Triangle. Kate O'Mara left at the beginning of the second series.

Starring

 Michael Craig – Captain John Anderson
 Larry Lamb – Matt Taylor
 Kate O'Mara – Katherine Laker
 Paul Jerricho – Charles Woodhouse

Recurring cast listed alphabetically:

 Dawn Addams – Mrs. Landers
 Tony Anholt – Nick Stevens
 David Arlen – Joe Francis
 Peter Arne – Kevin Warrender
 George Baker – David West
 Helena Breck – Sandy McCormick
 Dennis Burgess – George Terson
 Julia Chambers – Barbara Carter
 Diana Coupland – Marion Terson
 Sandra Dickinson – Penny Warrender
 Scott Fredericks – Tom Kelly
 Joan Greenwood – Judith Harper
 Philip Hatton – Tony Grant
 Penelope Horner – Sarah Hallam

 Elizabeth Larner – Jo Bailey
 Nicolette McKenzie – Maya Anderson
 Wanda Moore – Susan Porter
 Jonathan Newth – Roger Powell
 Cindy O'Callaghan – Linda Kennedy
 Jonathan Owen – Peter Nuttall
 Marion Owen Smith – Lisa Watkins
 Sandra Payne – Christine Harris
 Jamie Roberts – Bill Ryan
 Christopher Saul – Douglas Evans
 Jonathan Scott-Taylor – Ted Anderson
 Doug Sheldon – Arthur Parker
 Nigel Stock – Wally James

References

External links 
 
 Triangle at BBC Online

1981 British television series debuts
1983 British television series endings
1980s British television soap operas
BBC television dramas
British television soap operas
Nautical television series
English-language television shows